Lincoln is a town in Penobscot County, Maine. The town's population was 4,853 at the 2020 United States Census. A statue honoring Medal of Honor recipient Gary Gordon was installed in Lincoln, in 2021. The  bronze sculpture faces Gordon's grave at Park Street Cemetery.

Etymology
Lincoln is named after Maine's sixth governor, Enoch Lincoln.

Geography
Lincoln developed around a water powered sawmill on the east bank of the Penobscot River. Rollins Mountain is located in Lincoln. The town has 13 different ponds.

Demographics

2010
As of the census of 2010, there were 5,085 people, 2,045 households, and 1,415 families living in the town. The ethnic makeup of the town was 97.1% White, 0.3% African American, 0.6% Native American, 0.4% Asian, 0.1% from other races, and 1.5% from two or more races. Hispanic or Latino of any race were 1.0% of the population.

There were 2,045 households, of which 31.9% had children under the age of 18 living with them, 53.3% were married couples living together, 10.8% had a female householder with no husband present, 5.1% had a male householder with no wife present, and 30.8% were non-families. 24.4% of all households were made up of individuals, and 11% had someone living alone who was 65 years of age or older. The average household size was 2.44 and the average family size was 2.87.

The median age in the town was 42.3 years. 23.1% of residents were under the age of 18; 7.9% were between the ages of 18 and 24; 22.7% were from 25 to 44; 29.2% were from 45 to 64; and 17.2% were 65 years of age or older. The gender makeup of the town was 48.9% male and 51.1% female.

2000
As of the census of 2000, there were 5,221 people, 2,108 households, and 1,475 families living in the town. The ethnic makeup of the town was 98.35% White, 0.10%  or African American, 0.36% Native American, 0.40% Asian, 0.08% from other races, and 0.71% from two or more races. Hispanic of any race were 0.36% of the population.

There were 2,108 households, out of which 31.5% had children under the age of 18 living with them, 57.2% were married couples living together, 9.7% had a female householder with no husband present, and 30.0% were non-families. 24.2% of all households were made up of individuals, and 12.8% had someone living alone who was 65 years of age or older.  The average household size was 2.44 and the average family size was 2.87.

In the town, the population was spread out, with 24.3% under the age of 18, 7.3% from 18 to 24, 26.3% from 25 to 44, 24.9% from 45 to 64, and 17.3% who were 65 years of age or older.  The median age was 40 years. For every 100 females, there were 91.9 males.  For every 100 females age 18 and over, there were 89.0 males.

The median income for a household in the town was $30,823, and the median income for a family was $35,295. Males had a median income of $33,179 versus $21,286 for females. The per capita income for the town was $14,730.  About 13.6% of families and 17.0% of the population were below the poverty line, including 28.1% of those under age 18 and 4.4% of those age 65 or over.

Media 
The Lincoln News established in 1959, is designed, produced, and printed in Lincoln and serves as its local newspaper. Lincoln's former radio stations WLKN and WHMX went off-air in July 1995.

Notable people 

 Jeffery Gifford, member of the Maine House of Representatives (2006–2022)
 Terry Gilpatrick, Miss Maine (1977)
 Gary Gordon, Medal of Honor recipient, killed in action (1993)
 Samuel F. Hersey, U.S. congressman, "lumber baron", philanthropist
 Ernest Holmes (1887–1960), founder of the Religious Science movement
 Matthew Mulligan, American football player

References

Hawkins, Alan H., editor. The Mattanawcook Observer: a magazine of local history and genealogy of Lincoln, Maine and surrounding towns. Falmouth Foreside, Me.: The Mattanawcook Observer. Series of three volumes of magazine published from 1982 to 1985.
Bailey, May Edwards. History of TransAlpine, the southernmost part of the town of Lincoln, Maine, beyond the Alps. Lincoln, 1950. 
Fellows, Dana Willis. History of the Town of Lincoln, Penobscot County, Maine, 1822–1928. Lewiston: Dingley Press, 1929.

External links
 
 Regional School Unit No. 67
 Lincoln News

 
Towns in Penobscot County, Maine
Towns in Maine